This is a list of episodes and TV-movies for The Six Million Dollar Man. The episodes of The Bionic Woman that make up the crossovers are noted below.

Series overview

Pilot movies (1973) 

Some sources consider these movies to be part of Season 1 of the series, particularly the second and third films, which aired only a couple of months before the weekly series began. All three films were later re-edited into two-part episodes of the regular series, with additional footage added, for the purposes of network reruns and later syndication. In all three cases, the original opening titles are removed and replaced with the standard Six Million Dollar Man title sequence. In the case of "The Moon and the Desert", some of the additional footage consisted of clips from later seasons, including footage of Martin E. Brooks as Rudy Wells, even though Martin Balsam plays the character in the first telefilm, and operation footage from "The Bionic Woman" episode of season 2.

Episodes

Season 1 (1974)

Season 2 (1974–75)

Season 3 (1975–76)

Season 4 (1976–77)

Season 5 (1977–78)

Television movies (1987–1994)

See also
List of The Bionic Woman episodes

References

External links

Episodes
Lists of American science fiction television series episodes
Lists of American action television series episodes